Paula Kelley (born September 10, 1971) is an American indie pop singer-songwriter and orchestral arranger/composer from Boston, Massachusetts.

Career 
She began her musical career in the 1990s with the band Drop Nineteens before leaving them in 1994 to start her own career in songwriting. She worked with several other bands before finally going solo with her first album, Nothing/Everything, which was released in 2001 on Stop, Pop, and Roll Records in the US and then later on Caraway in Japan. The Trouble with Success or How You Fit into the World was released in 2003 on the independent Kimchee Records label in the US and again on Caraway in Japan. She followed this up with a US tour and a tour of France after the album's European release through Polaris Musique/Sony. Her latest release is the "Airports EP (2008)," a collection of four orchestrated tracks intended to be a teaser for her forthcoming album. Paula is known for her melodic, emotional songs, expansive instrumental arrangements and sweet, distinctive singing voice.

Kelley began playing piano at age three and was an orchestral harpsichordist by the time she was in high school. She also plays guitar, bass, drums, and other sundry instruments. She attended Phillips Exeter Academy, then Boston University (where she received her bachelor's degree with a double major of History/Political Science) and Berklee College of Music.

In 2005, Kelley relocated to Los Angeles to pursue a career scoring films and doing orchestral arrangements, in addition to recording and performing her own music. A filmography can be found on her professional website.

Discography 

The Airports EP (2008 Worm Kid Music)
Some Sucker's Life, Part 1: Demos and Lost Recordings (2006 Stop, Pop, and Roll Records)
The Trouble with Success or How You Fit into the World (2003 Kimchee Records)
Nothing/Everything (2001 Stop, Pop, and Roll Records)
A Bit Of Everything EP (2000 JacquesAss Records)
Why Christmas? with The Misfit Toys (1999 Rhubarb Records)
Break the Spell, Etc. EP with Boy Wonder (1999 Jackass Records)
5:01 with Paula Kelley Rock Band(1997 Rhubarb Records)
Wonder-Wear with Boy Wonder (1997 Cherrydisc/Roadrunner Records)
Mission to Destroy b/w Backyard 7-inch with Boy Wonder (self-released)
Speed – Danger – Death with Hot Rod (1993 Caroline/Hut Records)

External links 
Paula Kelley's website
Paula Kelley's professional composing/arranging website
Stop, Pop, and Roll website
Kimchee Records
Ho Ho Spice website

1970 births
Living people
20th-century American women guitarists
20th-century American guitarists
20th-century American women pianists
20th-century American pianists
20th-century American women singers
21st-century American women guitarists
21st-century American guitarists
21st-century American women pianists
21st-century American pianists
21st-century American women singers
American women pop singers
American women singer-songwriters
American indie pop musicians
American multi-instrumentalists
Berklee College of Music alumni
Boston University College of Arts and Sciences alumni
Guitarists from Massachusetts
Musicians from Boston
Phillips Exeter Academy alumni
20th-century American singers
21st-century American singers
Singer-songwriters from Massachusetts